The Shadow of an Empire is the second studio album by Irish singer-songwriter Fionn Regan, released on 8 February 2010 on Heavenly Records and Universal Music Ireland. The album's aesthetic differs from Regan's previous album, The End of History, featuring more electric guitar-based rock songs. Regarding this change in musical direction, Regan stated, "This album's lyrically quite fast, with lots of word changes and phrase changes, and it asked for a different kind of coat." In October 2009 the first single, "Protection Racket" was released as a free download.

Following the album's release, Regan toured with support act, Danny and the Champions of the World, appearing as his backing band.

Background and recording
Following the critical success of his debut album, The End of History, Fionn Regan began working on a follow-up with producer Ethan Johns. Described by Regan as "quite an uncompromising record" and "a combination of two uncompromising people", the album was ultimately shelved by his label, Lost Highway.

Regarding their decision not to release the album, Regan states that "Sometimes when you discuss making a record with a record company, everyone draws a sketch of the house, and when you come back with the finished thing it's like, 'Oh, we thought the doors were going to be on the left side.' [...] [the album] is in a vault somewhere. It ended up getting clamped on the docks and the tariff was too high to get it out, and they put red tape around it. And so, I backed out of the drive and made the record that I set out to make."

Regan subsequently left Lost Highway and relocated to Ireland to start afresh, recording in an old biscuit factory.

The majority of The Shadow of an Empire was written whilst Fionn Regan was touring in support of The End of History. Regan states that he wrote character-based songs on his typewriter first, before putting the words to music, and notes that:

Track listing
All tracks written and arranged by Fionn Regan.
 "Protection Racket" – 2:39
 "Catacombs" – 3:25
 "Coathook" – 2:20
 "Genocide Matinee" – 3:52
 "Violent Demeanour" – 3:32
 "Lines Written In Winter" – 3:58
 "House Detective" – 3:06
 "Little Nancy" – 3:17
 "Lord Help My Poor Soul" – 4:45
 "The Shadow of an Empire" – 4:04

Personnel
Adapted from the album liner notes.

Musicians
Fionn Regan – vocals, guitar, organ, piano, lapsteel, tambourine, bullhorn, bass guitar ("Genocide Matinee")
Brian Murphy – drums, bass guitar ("Protection Racket")
Stephen O'Brien – bass guitar
Laura Murphy – backing vocals ("Catacombs", "Violent Demeanor", "Little Nancy"), reception bell ("Protection Racket")
Drew McConnell – bass guitar ("Lord Help My Poor Soul")
Gavin Wheatley – piano ("Violent Demeanor", "House Detective")

Production
Fionn Regan – producer, additional engineering ("Genocide Matinee")
Brian Murphy – engineer
Stephen O'Brien – engineering assistant
Paul Stacy – mixing
Steve Rooke — mastering

Artwork
Fionn Regan – artwork, design
Laura Murphy – artwork assistant
Autumn de Wilde – cover photograph
Swollen Design – photography of artwork and layout

References

External links
Universal Music Ireland Bio
Heavenly Recordings Bio
Diverse Records Bio

2010 albums
Fionn Regan albums